Jack Rea (born 8 August 1990) is an English professional wrestler. He is currently signed to WWE, where he performs on the NXT brand under the ring name Rip Fowler. He is also known for his work as Zack Gibson on the UK independent circuit. He formed the tag team Grizzled Young Veterans with James Drake (now known as Jagger Reid) in 2017, becoming the inaugural NXT UK Tag Team Champions and three-time Progress Tag Team Champions.

Early life 
Rea was born in Liverpool on 8 August 1990. He grew up in nearby Maghull, where he attended Deyes High School. He graduated with a degree in accounting and finance from Liverpool John Moores University in 2011. Before wrestling, he played football.

Professional wrestling career

Independent circuit (2009–2019)
After being trained by Alex Shane, Rea made his pro-wrestling debut in 2009 for English promotion, FutureShock Wrestling as Zack Diamond. In March 2010, Rea started using the ring name of Zack Gibson. Gibson entered the FutureShock Trophy Tournament 2011 making it to the finals only to lose to CJ Banks. In 2010, Rea made his debut for Grand Pro Wrestling as Zack Diamond losing to Jack Gallagher. Diamond became GPW British Champion after defeating former champion CJ Banks, Gallagher and Martin Kirby in a four-way scramble match. A year later after his GPW debut, Diamond teamed with Xander Cooper, Mikey Whiplash and Danny Hope where they defeated Gallagher, Bruce Sheila, William Gaylord and Noam Dar. At GPW Heroes & Villains, Diamond lost the championship to Jack Gallagher.

In 2016, Gibson made his debut for 5 Star Wrestling, losing to Big Damo. In 2018, before the promotion's closure, Gibson made his return to 5 Star losing to Rey Mysterio by disqualification after hitting Mysterio with a low blow.

In March 2017 Gibson made his debut for WhatCulture Pro Wrestling (later Defiant Wrestling) as part of the Pro Wrestling World Cup - English qualifiers, losing to Jimmy Havoc in the first round. He began wrestling on Defiant's weekly program Loaded in late 2017 into 2018. He defeated Rampage Brown at the February 18, 2018 event Chain Reaction. His final match for the promotion before leaving for WWE, would be in March 2018, with Gibson losing a Magnificent 7 qualifying match.

Progress Wrestling (2012, 2014–2019)
In 2012, Gibson made his Progress Wrestling debut at the debut show for Progress.
In 2014, Gibson returned to Progress at Chapter Twelve, defeating Will Ospreay. In 2017, Gibson and James Drake formed villainous a tag team called Grizzled Young Veterans. Grizzled Young Veterans defeated Chris Brookes and Kid Lykos of CCK to become the Progress tag team champions. They successfully defended the titles against Aussie Open at Progress Chapter 59. At Chapter 61, Grizzled Young Veterans defeated Moustache Mountain to retain their championships. In 2018, Gibson took part of the Super Strong Style 16 Tournament, defeating Joey Janela in the first round and Pete Dunne by disqualification in the quarter finals before he was eliminated by Kassius Ohno in the semi-finals.

Insane Championship Wrestling (2015–2017)
Gibson debuted for Insane Championship Wrestling in 2015 during the Road to Fear and Loathing tour losing an eight-man tag team match to the New Age Kliq. In 2017 at Fear & Loathing X, Gibson and Rob Van Dam were defeated by Lionheart in a three-way elimination match. On 16 June 2017 Gibson defeated Kenny Williams in a falls count anywhere match to win the ICW Zero-G Championship. Gibson lost the championship back to Williams the following month in a ladder match.

Revolution Pro Wrestling (2017–2018)
Gibson was defeated by Trent Seven in his Revolution Pro Wrestling (RevPro) debut match. At RevPro Epic Encounter 2017, Gibson was defeated by Hirooki Goto. In June, Gibson defeated Angélico. At Summer Sizzler, Gibson defeated Dalton Castle. Gibson took part of RevPro and New Japan Pro-Wrestling's joint show, Global Wars UK losing to Yuji Nagata on night one and Toru Yano on night two. Gibson and Josh Bodom defeated Aussie Open to become number one contenders for the RevPro Undisputed British Tag Team Championships. Gibson and Bodom lost to RevPro tag team champions, Moustache Mountain (Trent Seven and Tyler Bate).

WWE

NXT UK (2018–2020) 
Gibson was announced for WWE's WrestleMania Axxess during Wrestlemania 34 weekend as part of a WWE United Kingdom Championship invitational where he lost to Mark Andrews in the first round. On day four of axxess, Grizzled Young Veterans retained their Progress tag team championships by disqualification against Heavy Machinery. Around this time, it was revealed by Wrestling Observer that Gibson was signed to a WWE contract.

On 16 May 2018, it was announced that Gibson would be one of the 16 participants in the upcoming WWE United Kingdom Championship Tournament with the winner of the tournament facing Pete Dunne for the United Kingdom Championship. Gibson defeated Amir Jordan in the opening round. He would go on to defeat Gentleman Jack Gallagher and Flash Morgan Webster in the second round and semi-finals, respectively. He would then defeat Travis Banks in the finals and would go on to challenge WWE United Kingdom Champion, Pete Dunne, the next night in a losing effort.

In 2019, they defeated Moustache Mountain (Tyler Bate & Trent Seven) at NXT UK TakeOver: Blackpool in the finals of a tournament to become the inaugural NXT UK Tag Team Champions. After some defences, they would lose the titles to Mark Andrews and Flash Morgan Webster at NXT Takeover: Cardiff in a triple-threat tag team also involving Gallus. On 11 September Drake and Gibson unsuccessfully challenged Andrews & Webster in a rematch. They would have another title match at NXT UK Takeover: Blackpool II against the new champions Gallus, Andrews & Webster and Imperium in a ladder match where the champions retained.

In parallel to their NXT UK Tag Team Championship pursuit at NXT UK TakeOver: Blackpool II, Drake and Gibson competed in the 2020 Dusty Rhodes Tag Team Classic. They defeated Kushida and Alex Shelley in the quarterfinals and NXT Tag Team Champions Bobby Fish and Kyle O'Reilly of The Undisputed Era in the semifinals, before losing to The BroserWeights (Matt Riddle and Pete Dunne) in the finals.

NXT (2020–present) 
On the 19 February 2020 episode of NXT, the Grizzled Young Veterans joined the NXT brand, defeating Raul Mendoza and Joaquin Wilde before announcing their intent to take over NXT's tag team division, establishing themselves as tweeners.

Personal life 
Rea is a fan of Liverpool F.C. and The Beatles. He named his submission hold and finishing move to reference both respectively: a kimura lock called the Shankly Gates and an over-the-shoulder double knee facebreaker called the Ticket to Ride.

Championships and accomplishments
5 Star Wrestling
5 Star: Real World Championship (1 time)
 Attack! Pro Wrestling
Attack! Pro Wrestling 24/7 Championship (1 time) – with Sam Bailey
 Britannia Wrestling Promotions
One Night Tournament winner (1 time)
PWI:BWP World Catchweight Championship (1 time)
 FutureShock Wrestling
FSW Championship (3 times)
FSW Trophy Tournament 2015 winner (1 time)
Lotto-Thunder Tournament 2013 winner (1 time)
 Grand Pro Wrestling
GPW British Championship (2 times)
GPW Heavyweight Championship (1 time) – with Sean Daniels, James Drake, Axl Rage, and Dave Rayne 
2018 Thunderbrawl Winner
 Insane Championship Wrestling
ICW Zero-G Championship (1 time)
 New Generation Wrestling
NGW Tag Team Championship (1 time) – with Sam Bailey
 Over the Top Wrestling
OTT Tag Team Championship (1 time) – with Charlie Sterling and Sha Samuels
Pro Wrestling Illustrated
 Ranked No. 207 of the top 500 singles wrestlers in the PWI 500 in 2019
 Progress Wrestling
Progress Tag Team Championship (3 times) – with James Drake
 WWE
NXT UK Tag Team Championship (1 time, inaugural) – with James Drake
NXT UK Tag Team Championship Tournament (2019)
United Kingdom Championship Tournament (2018)

References

External links
 
 WWE Tournament Profile
 
 
 

1990 births
Living people
Sportspeople from Liverpool
English male professional wrestlers
Alumni of Liverpool John Moores University
21st-century professional wrestlers
NXT UK Tag Team Champions
PROGRESS Tag Team Champions